Juice is a podcast aggregator for Windows and OS X used for downloading media files such as ogg and mp3 for playback on the computer or for copying to a digital audio player. Juice lets a user schedule downloading of specific podcasts, and will notify the user when a new show is available. It is free software available under the GNU General Public License. The project is hosted at SourceForge. Formerly known as iPodder and later as iPodder Lemon, the software's name was changed to Juice in November 2005 in the face of legal pressure from Apple, Inc.

Development

The original development team was formed by Erik de Jonge, Robin Jans, Martijn Venrooy, Perica Zivkovic from the company Active8 based in the Netherlands, Andrew Grumet, Garth Kidd and Mark Posth joined the team soon after the first release. The development team credited the program concept to Adam Curry who wrote a little Applescript as a proof of concept and provided the first podcast shows (then referred to as 'audio enclosures') but primarily to Dave Winer who was the inspiration for Adam Curry. The first version also included a screenscraper for normal HTML files. Initially it was not clear that podcasting would be completely tied to RSS. Although that was eventually the method chosen, during the early development phase a diverse range of people were working on alternatives, including a version based on Freenet.

The program is written in Python and, through use of a cross-platform UI library, runs on Mac OS X and Microsoft Windows 2000 or Windows XP. A Linux variant has not been developed.

The 2004 growth of podcasting inspired other podcatching programs, such as jPodder, as well as the June 2005 addition of a podcast subscription feature in Apple's iTunes music player. This development quickly put an end to the popularity of the Juice application.

In 2006 the team effectively stopped further development of the program, the developers started working in other fields, some Podcasting related. The team from Active8 created PodNova (http://www.podnova.com) an application which still integrates very well with Juice with the opml interface. Adam Curry and Andrew Grumet started working on a commercial show network (podshow) where all the shows are sponsored and the distinction between show and commercial is faded to the background. Others went on to other ventures.

Forks
There have been several forks of Juice:
 PodNova, which was available on Windows, Mac OS X and Linux, but closed at the end of February 2010.

See also

 Comparison of feed aggregators

References

External links
 

Digital audio
Free multimedia software
Free software programmed in Python
Podcasting software